Carauari is a municipality located in the Brazilian state of Amazonas. Its population was 28,508 (2020) and its area is 25,767 km².

The city is served by Carauari Airport.

Environment

The town is in the Juruá-Purus moist forests ecoregion.
The municipality contains about 5% of the Tefé National Forest, created in 1989.
The municipality contains  Médio Juruá Extractive Reserve, created in 1997, on the left bank of the meandering Juruá River.
It also contains the  Uacari Sustainable Development Reserve, created in 2005.

Climate

References

Municipalities in Amazonas (Brazilian state)